The Lazarus Syndrome is a 1979 American made-for-television drama thriller film directed by Jerry Thorpe. It was later the basis for a weekly television series of the same name, airing on the ABC network.

Cast 
 Louis Gossett Jr. as Dr. MacArthur St. Clair
 Ronald Hunter as Joe Hamill
 E. G. Marshall as Dr. Mendel
 Sheila Frazier as Gloria St. Clair
 Lara Parker as Denice
 Peggy Walton-Walker as Mrs. Hamill
 René Enríquez as Mr. Dominguez
 Philip Sterling as Skeptical Doctor
 Peggy McCay as Stacy
 Arthur Rosenberg as Anesthesiologist
 Mary Carver as Nurse
 Roberta Jean Williams as Nurse
 Ethelinn Block as Nurse
 Vincent Milana
John Berwick as Crash Cart Nurse
 Jeffrey Jacquet as St. Clair Son
 Alene Wilson

External links 

1979 television films
1979 films
1970s thriller drama films
American thriller drama films
American thriller television films
Television shows set in New York City
1970s English-language films
Films directed by Jerry Thorpe
1970s American films